Kachalino is a rural locality (a settlement) and the administrative center of Kachalinskoye Rural Settlement, Ilovlinsky District, Volgograd Oblast, Russia. The population was 2,304 as of 2010. There are 24 streets.

Geography 
The village is located on the Volga Upland, 65 km from Volgograd and 37 km from Ilovlya.

References 

Rural localities in Ilovlinsky District